Distinguished Young Women, formerly known as America's Junior Miss, is a national non-profit organization that provides scholarship opportunities to high school senior girls.  Depending on the schedule of the various state and local programs, young women are eligible during the summer preceding their senior year in high school. This program is designed to provide young women with the opportunity and support needed to succeed before, during, and after attending college. In addition, through the Distinguished Young Women Life Skills program, which includes workshops and online resources, participants can learn skills like interviewing, public speaking, self-confidence building and much more. Since its creation in 1958, over 700,000 young ladies have participated in competitions spanning the United States. Participants compete in the categories of Interview (25%), Scholastics (25%), Talent (20%), Fitness (15%), and Self-Expression (15%). Each state hosts a state program in which the chosen representative advances to the national program, held in the program's birthplace of Mobile, Alabama. Each year the Distinguished Young Women program gives out over $1 billion in scholarships. The Distinguished Young Women program is free to enter.

History

Early years
In the late 1920s, Mobile's Junior Chamber of Commerce, known today as the Jaycees, began the earliest form of the Junior Miss program as an annual floral pageant in the spring to encourage participation from residents in local beautification projects, including azalea flowers. The winner of the pageant would eventually choose her successor to carry on the role of representing the annual program: an act similar to what every America's Junior Miss has done a year after winning the title, but it's the judges who decide first.

Shortly after the Second World War, the Junior Chamber changed the program especially for young high school juniors to participate. Prizes included the honor of being queen of the Azalea Trail Maids, Mobile's official hostesses at special events. Before 1957, the Junior Chamber realized that not only were Mobilians participating in their program, so were Mississippi and Florida residents. It was decided that year to make the program national, allowing high school seniors from every state to participate in the renamed America's Junior Miss. Unlike the Miss America pageant which started as a beauty pageant, but now includes judging on Evening Gown, Private 12 Minute Interview, On Stage Q & A, and Swimsuit, America's Junior Miss has always been a scholarship program.  America's Junior Miss participants were required to be seniors in high school and were judged on scholastic achievement, creative and performing arts, physical fitness, poise and appearance, and a judges' interview.  Bathing suits were never a part of the America's Junior Miss.

The first national finals were held in March 1958 at the Saenger Theater in downtown Mobile, with 18 states represented. Phyllis Whitenack of West Virginia won $5000 in scholarship money, along with the title of America's Junior Miss.

1960s
In 1963, all 50 states had their own Junior Miss in the national finals. The 1960s was a decade of excellence for the America's Junior Miss program, with new sponsors such as Kodak and Chevrolet, the program was able to continue increasing scholarship beyond $24,000 and bring Mobile's annual event before the eyes of network television viewers regularly for 20 years starting in 1965. From 1965-1972, the pageant was telecast on NBC. Among the entertainers invited to perform at the finals early in the Sixties was Eddie Fisher. In this decade, two holders of the Junior Miss title would soon lead successful careers while supporting the organization that helped them along the way. Missouri Junior Miss and America's Junior Miss 1961 Mary Frann would one day appear on TV programs such as "Newhart" and numerous variety shows in her acting career. Frann helped found the alumnae organization America's Junior Miss Council in 1995. Kentucky Junior Miss and America's Junior Miss 1963 Diane Sawyer continued to support the program as her career in journalism continued, which led to a position at the ABC Television Network program "Good Morning America" and most recently to be the second woman to individually hold the anchor chair nationally for a nightly news program World News on ABC television (Barbara Walters, Elizabeth Vargas and Connie Chung co-anchored with male counterparts).

1970s
The New Seekers appeared at the May 1973 finals, hosted by Ed McMahon. Beginning in 1973, the telecast aired annually on CBS, where it would stay through 1985. Actor Michael Landon would host the national finals for the first time in 1974, his first out of seven appearances. Also in 1974, Donna Alexander of New Jersey, became the first black female to reach this point of the competition. Alumni from this decade include America's Junior Miss 1973 Linda Rutledge Delbridge of Kansas, who would one day become a computer scientist and executive for IBM. Georgia Junior Miss 1976 Deborah Norville followed a journalism career path that would earn her the job of hosting the syndicated news program "Inside Edition". Maryland Junior Miss 1971 was Kathie Lee Gifford, who would one day host a syndicated talk show with TV personality Regis Philbin. In spite of never advancing to the 1971 finals, Georgia contender Kim Basinger would later have an acting career that would lead her to an Academy Award for Best Supporting Actress for her role in the movie L.A. Confidential. Before becoming a Tony Award-winning producer, Bonnie Comley, won the talent competition in the Junior Miss Massachusetts program in 1977.

1980s
Andy Gibb performed for the audience and the Junior Misses participating at the 1980 national finals. One year later, the format known as "theater in the round" was introduced for the finals and its television broadcasts. Mary Frann returned for the finals in 1985 to co-host with Caitlyn Jenner, the last telecast in an annual run on CBS that began in 1973.  The outreach program "Be Your Best Self" became the official platform of the America's Junior Miss program in 1987, when Wisconsin's Junior Miss Chuti Tiu became the first non-Caucasian national winner. America's Junior Miss 1980 Julie Bryan Moran hosted the finals in 1988. The national finals were moved from the Mobile Civic Center arena to the theater section in 1989. Among the Junior Miss participants in this decade who would become well known were Georgia's Julie Moran, who would anchor the syndicated TV program "Entertainment Tonight" and 1986 Rhode Island Junior Miss Debra Messing, whose acting career led to earning one of the leading roles in the sitcom "Will & Grace". At the end of the Eighties, the name of the program was changed to "America's Young Woman of the Year" to renew interest, but it was later realized that this new identity was unlike the long established brand of America's Junior Miss that interested many participants. The name "America's Junior Miss" would be restored in 1993.

1990s
In 1994, the America's Junior Miss finals once again became a national event on television. One of the guests this time was actor Brian Austin Green of the TV series "Beverly Hills, 90210". One year later, the NBC Television Network stopped televising the finals. The judging criteria for the local and national levels of the program would be revamped in 1995. With help from David G. Bronner of the Retirement Systems of Alabama and Raycom Media, viewers got to see Alabama's Junior Miss Tyrenda Williams become the first black America's Junior Miss in 1997 and earn $30,000 in scholarship out of a total of $97,500 for the winners. The number of stations airing the national finals would increase from 50 to 177 in 1998. The 1999 finals, hosted by 1976 Georgia Junior Miss Deborah Norville aired tape-delayed on The Nashville Network, which would air the event live in 2000 and 2001.

2000s
In 2000, for the first time ever, a scholarship of $50,000 was the top prize and Utah Junior Miss Jesika Henderson earned it along with the title of America's Junior Miss that year. Both Deborah Norville and Karen Morris Gowdy took part in the 2001 finals, with Norville hosting the finals and Gowdy handling the preliminary round. Singer Toby Keith provided entertainment for the finals. Dan Marino joined Norville for the finals in 2002, which aired nationally on the PAX TV network. Billy Gilman and 3rd Faze were also part of the 2002 finals. The 2004 finals were a little different from previous years, as the 50 Junior Misses were taped for documentary segments spanning their two weeks of preparation.

In 2005, the AJM Board of Directors' executive committee was unsuccessful at retaining sponsors and a major television network willing enough to broadcast the national finals. The Board of Directors had no choice but to make the 2005 national finals on June 25 possibly the very last for America's Junior Miss. After Mississippi's Junior Miss Kelli Lynn Schutz was chosen and given a $50,000 scholarship, she was not originally scheduled for any of the traditional AJM appearances. The 2005 finals, hosted by 2000 America's Junior Miss Jesika Henderson and actor Nicky Brown, airing live on the Mobile CBS affiliate WKRG-TV and pre-recorded for PAX TV on June 27 was a celebration of all 48 years of accomplishing a feat that no other organization similar to AJM would attempt: prepare and encourage the lives of young women beginning to enter a new world of possibility.

The organization had originally set a date of September 30, 2005 to end operations. A group of concerned Junior Miss supporters, under the band of Friends of AJM and with the website saveajm.org, fought for the continuation of the program. On August 9 the board of directors decided that the national finals should continue to be held in Mobile, only without any national television coverage as part of the new budget.

Through the efforts of Junior Miss supporters across the country, America's Junior Miss continued operations from the national headquarters in Mobile. The board of directors hired Becky Jo Peterson, formerly chair of the California Junior Miss program, as the new executive director. In June 2006, 50 state Junior Misses spent two weeks in Mobile, Alabama, for the 49th annual national finals where Kentucky's Junior Miss Taylor Phillips was chosen as the new America's Junior Miss. More than $100,000 in scholarships were awarded at the national finals to the class of 2006.

2007 marked the 50th anniversary of America's Junior Miss. The national finals were held June 28–30 at the Mobile Civic Center Theater in Mobile, where more than $150,000 in scholarships were awarded.

2010s
It was announced on June 26, 2010 that America's Junior Miss would now be renamed Distinguished Young Women.  This change was intended in part to help differentiate the program from pageants. Idaho's Madison Denise Leonard was named America's first Distinguished Young Woman.
Tennessee's Katye Brock was Named America's 2011 Distinguished Young Woman. Christina Maxwell of Asheville, North Carolina was named Distinguished Young Woman of America for 2012.  Nicole Renard of Washington State was named Distinguished Young Woman of America for 2013. Brooke Rucker of Georgia was the Distinguished Young Woman of America for 2014. On June 27, 2015, Alaska's Máire Nakada was named the Distinguished Young Woman of America for 2015. In 2016, Tara Moore of South Carolina was named Distinguished Young Woman of America. The next year saw Skye Bork of DC named Distinguished Young Woman of 2017. On June 30, 2018, Aaryan Morrison from Kokomo, Indiana was named Distinguished Young Woman of 2018.

2020s
2020 saw the competition held for the first time virtually resulting from COVID-19 pandemic.

Past winners

Winners by state

States without winners
There have been no winners from the following states: 

 Colorado
 Delaware
 Florida
 Hawaii
 Iowa
 Louisiana
 Maine
 Maryland
 Massachusetts
 Montana
 Nebraska
 Nevada
 New Hampshire
 New Mexico
 New York
 North Dakota
 Ohio
 South Dakota
 Vermont

References

External links

Cultural institutions in Mobile, Alabama
1958 establishments in the United States
American awards
Junior Chamber International
Women in the United States